Barro Alto may refer to the following places in Brazil:

 Barro Alto, Bahia
 Barro Alto, Goiás